The first season of Two and a Half Men, an American television sitcom created by Chuck Lorre and Lee Aronsohn, aired its pilot episode on September 22, 2003, at 9:30 p.m., ET/PT, on CBS, a U.S. broadcast television network. The pilot received great reviews and an Artios Award nomination for Best Casting for TV, Comedy Pilot (Nikki Valko, Ken Miller). In the week of October 1, 2003, the series was ranked 7th highest in the top ten shows of the week according to Nielsen Research, with an average 12.1/18 rating. Thanks to this, the series was able to air another 23 episodes, and was renewed for a second season in 2004. The DVD set was released on Region 2 on September 12, 2005, and on Region 1 on September 11, 2007. Its bonus material included: a blooper, outtakes, a backstage tour with Angus T. Jones and a behind-the-scenes special, with the cast and crew of Two and a Half Men.

Production
The series is set in a large oceanfront home in Malibu, California, although most of the series is filmed in Burbank, California at the Warner Brothers Burbank Studios at 4000 Warner Boulevard. The show features Charlie Sheen as Charlie Harper, Jon Cryer as Alan Harper, Angus T. Jones as Jake Harper, Holland Taylor as Evelyn Harper, Melanie Lynskey as Rose and Marin Hinkle as Judith Harper. Conchata Ferrell as Berta had a recurring role in the first season, but became a main cast member in the following season. The song, "Manly Men", was written by the show's creator Chuck Lorre, and the signature opening intro features the theme being lip-synced by the show's three main actors, but they are not the original performers. One of the performers is Elizabeth Daily.

Casting
Originally, actress Blythe Danner was cast to portray Evelyn Harper, but when she started to suggest changes to scenes, she was dismissed by the producers; one of the bosses commented: "Blythe is a wonderful actress who was put in a part that was not a good fit for her."

"Most Chicks Won't Eat Veal", the original pilot, with Danner as Evelyn, remained unaired. According to the Internet Movie Database, Sheen was cast because the creators saw him on Spin City, in which he also portrayed a charming bachelor afraid of commitment. The show was becoming a huge hit, and breathed much needed life into Sheen's fading career. Before their reunion on the series, Cryer and Sheen had both appeared in the comedy Hot Shots!. Other connections between the actors are that Taylor, Sheen and Cryer have each appeared in a John Hughes film (Sheen in Ferris Bueller's Day Off, Cryer in Pretty in Pink and Taylor in She's Having a Baby), and that Jones, Ferrell, Taylor and Hinkle have all made guest appearances in ER. Additionally, Sheen and Cryer each made guest appearances on the animated series Family Guy.

Cast

Main
 Charlie Sheen as Charlie Harper, a cheeky-chappy, jingle-writing bachelor whose life is dramatically changed when his brother moves in after separating from his wife, with his son visiting on the weekends. Charlie has a bad relationship with his mother, and has sex with an endless string of women.
 Jon Cryer as Dr. Alan Harper, Charlie's younger brother. A chiropractor who has just separated from his wife of twelve years, Judith Harper, and is the father of Jake, who has a big appetite. Initially, Alan still loves Judith and does everything he can to be reconciled, but eventually they are divorced, with Alan paying alimony and child support.
 Angus T. Jones as Jake Harper, the son of Alan and Judith Harper, who is upset by the separation of his parents. Jake is considerably sharp-witted for a boy his age, but his personality drastically changes as the series progresses. 
 Marin Hinkle as Judith Harper, the ex-wife of Alan Harper and mother of Jake Harper. Judith and Alan had just separated in the pilot episode, when she told him that she is gay, but she was later seen with other men and also briefly reunited with Alan. Alan pays Judith alimony and child support, but it is never mentioned whether she has ever held a job when living with Alan or afterwards.
 Melanie Lynskey as Rose, the boundary-challenged stalker of Charlie Harper. They had a one-night stand and she will not let him forget it, claiming that she loves him. Regardless, the two eventually become close friends. Rose has a close friendship with Jake and eventually forms friendships with Alan, Berta, and Evelyn.
 Holland Taylor as Evelyn Harper, the four-time divorced mother of Charlie and Alan Harper. Evelyn has her own real estate agency, is sexually rapacious and has a strained relationship with her sons and grandson. Evelyn loathes Judith and Berta.

Recurring
 Conchata Ferrell as Berta, Charlie's heavyset, acid-tongued housekeeper. She initially hates the presence of Alan and Jake, but soon forms a close relationship with both of them.
 Jane Lynch as Dr. Linda Freedman

Guests

 Kristin Bauer as Laura
 Jennifer Taylor as Suzanne
 Liz Vassey as Kate
 Christine Dunford as Gloria
 Tricia O'Kelley as Brooke
 Eric Allan Kramer as Bill
 Krista Allen as Olivia Pearson
 Kristin Dattilo as Cindy
 Myndy Crist as Wendy
 Denise Richards as Lisa
 Megan Fox as Prudence
 Richard Lewis as Stan
 Jenna Elfman as Frankie
 Juliette Goglia as Joanie
 Chris O'Donnell as Bill
 Teri Hatcher as Liz
 Heather Locklear as Laura Lang
 Stacey Travis as Linda	
 Cheryl White as Ruth	
 Amy Farrington as Kathleen	
 Yvette Nicole Brown as Mandy
 Terry Rhoads as Dr. Andrew Sperlock

Awards and nominations
Two and a Half Men was nominated for three Primetime Emmy Awards but lost all three of them. The show won the People's Choice Awards for Best New Comedy Series and was nominated for two Young Artist Awards for Best Family Television Series (Comedy or Drama) and for Best Performance in a TV series (Comedy or Drama) and won one for Angus T. Jones for playing Jake Harper. It won the ASCAP award for Top TV Series and it also won BMI Film and TV Award for Best Music in TV. It was also nominated Casting Society of America for the casting of a series.

Episodes

References

General references

External links

Season 1
2003 American television seasons
2004 American television seasons